Putyatino is a rural locality (a selo) and the administrative center of Putyatinsky Selsoviet of Mazanovsky District, Amur Oblast, Russia. The population was 265 as of 2018. There are 13 streets.

Geography 
Putyatino is located on the left bank of the Selemdzha River, 16 km northeast of Novokiyevsky Uval (the district's administrative centre) by road. Taskino is the nearest rural locality.

References 

Rural localities in Mazanovsky District